The Herald Weekly is a weekly American newspaper based in Huntersville, North Carolina. It is part of the Carolina Weekly Newspaper Group.

The paper serves the communities of South Charlotte, Lake Norman, Union County, Matthews, Mint Hill, Mooresville, Denver, and Mountain Island.

External links
The Herald Weekly

Weekly newspapers published in North Carolina
Mecklenburg County, North Carolina